The Giant is a London plane tree, located in the city Chojna, Poland. It is one of the thickest trees in the country.

The name of the tree in Polish – Olbrzym – means a very large, huge thing (even a person).

The Giant is about 300 years old, according to the dendrochronological research, and once stood in the Viereck'scher Garten. It is a monumental, 35 m tall tree with a trunk circumference of 1066 cm (in 2014, at the narrowest place, 0.45 m high). Its circumference at breast height (CBH) is 11 m (in 2015).

This plane has a large, probably multistemmed, ellipsoid trunk. It forks at heights of 2.5 and 5 m, creating a large crown.

The tree is preserved by the local government because it had been set on fire several times. Since 2011 it is fenced to protect it from birds and insects.

In 2012, it was judged among the best trees in the competition for tree of the year in Poland.

The Giant Plane is the third thickest tree in Poland, and the largest and oldest London plane in the country.

References

Further reading 
 Paweł Zarzyński, Robert Tomusiak, Krzysztof Borkowski, Drzewa Polski, PWN, Warszawa, 2016, 
 Krzysztof Borkowski, Polskie drzewa, Wyd. DALPO, Poznań, 2014, 
 Paweł Zarzyński, Robert Tomusiak, 90 drzew - Okazy niezwykłe Centrum Informacyjne Lasów Państwowych, Warszawa, 2014,

See also 
 Bartek oak
 Bażyński Oak
 Jagiełło Oak

Individual trees in Poland
Natural monuments of Poland
Landmarks in Poland
Flora of Poland
Individual plane trees